Almeida is a fortified village and a municipality in the sub-region of Beira Interior Norte and the District of Guarda, Portugal. The town proper has a population of 1,300 people (2011). It is located in Riba-Côa river valley. The present Mayor is António Baptista Ribeiro, elected by the Social Democratic Party. The municipal holiday is July 2.

Location 
The Rio Côa run northwards a short distance to the west of the village. The town's castle fortress was completed in 1641 and is located to the north of the village and is approached through the two tunnel gates and dry moat named the Portas de São Francisco.

Twin town 
  Mutzig, Bas-Rhin, France

History 

In and around the environment of Almeida, evidence of Human occupation can be found back to the Bronze Age and Iron Age. Evidence has also been found of Roman occupation followed by the Suevi and the Visigoths. 

The first fortification constructed in the settlement were constructed by the Muslims who occupied the village until Christian reconquest of the Iberian Peninsula. It was during this time that the current name was first used, in the form of the Arabic المائدة al-Ma'ida ('the table'). This name refers to a legend that an ornate bejeweled table captured by Tariq ibn Ziyad was the dining table of King Solomon.

Sancho I, The Populator 
The village of Almeida was captured from the Moors by the second king of Portugal, Sancho I in the 12th century because of its strategic position on the new country of Portugal's border with Spain. So important to the security of the country, Sancho had the village heavily fortified. The castle was refortified on three further occasions by King Dinis, King Manuel I and by King João VI. The present 12 pointed star fortification was constructed in 1641 to a Vaubanesque plan on which the French military engineer is believed to have personally worked, during the castle's final stages of completion.

Spanish occupation 
During the Seven Years' War (1754 to 1763) which involved most of the great powers of Europe, Spain with the help of France launched an attack on Portugal due to its alliance with Great Britain. As a result of the invasion Almeida was captured by Spain in 1762.

Almeida Fortress 

The fortress around the town guards an important cross-border road from Spain, and underwent several sieges. The siege of 1810, during the Peninsular War, ended spectacularly when a chance shell ignited the main gunpowder magazine, which exploded, killing 500 defenders and destroying most of the town.

Parishes
Administratively, the municipality is divided into 16 civil parishes (freguesias):

 Almeida 
 Amoreira, Parada e Cabreira
 Azinhal, Peva e Vale Verde
 Castelo Bom
 Castelo Mendo, Ade, Monte Perobolço e Mesquitela
 Freineda
 Freixo
 Junça e Naves
 Leomil, Mido, Senouras e Aldeia Nova
 Malhada Sorda
 Malpartida e Vale de Coelha
 Miuzela e Porto de Ovelha
 Nave de Haver
 São Pedro de Rio Seco
 Vale da Mula
 Vilar Formoso

Notable people 
 António Ginestal Machado (1873 in Almeida – 1940) a politician, 87th Prime Minister of Portugal in 1923
 Pedro Zaz (born 1978 in Almeida) a Portuguese New-Media artist
 José P. Peixoto (born 1922 in Miuzela) a Portuguese meteorologist

References

External links

Municipality official website
Photos from Almeida

Municipalities of Guarda District
Towns in Portugal